Collierville is a census-designated place in San Joaquin County, California. The 2020 United States census reported Collierville's population was 2,698.

Geography
According to the United States Census Bureau, the CDP covers an area of 6.6 square miles (17.1 km2), 99.85% of it land, and 0.15% of it water.

Demographics

The 2010 United States Census reported that Collierville had a population of 1,934. The racial makeup of Collierville was 1,552 (80.2%) White, 14 (0.7%) African American, 21 (1.1%) Native American, 49 (2.5%) Asian, 1 (0.1%) Pacific Islander, 229 (11.8%) from other races, and 68 (3.5%) from two or more races. Hispanic or Latino of any race were 518 persons (26.8%).

The Census reported that 1,912 people (98.9% of the population) lived in households, 22 (1.1%) lived in non-institutionalized group quarters, and 0 (0%) were institutionalized.

There were 667 households, out of which 239 (35.8%) had children under the age of 18 living in them, 420 (63.0%) were opposite-sex married couples living together, 57 (8.5%) had a female householder with no husband present, 48 (7.2%) had a male householder with no wife present.  There were 36 (5.4%) unmarried opposite-sex partnerships, and 8 (1.2%) same-sex married couples or partnerships. 113 households (16.9%) were made up of individuals, and 59 (8.8%) had someone living alone who was 65 years of age or older. The average household size was 2.87.  There were 525 families (78.7% of all households); the average family size was 3.18.

The population was spread out, with 459 people (23.7%) under the age of 18, 157 people (8.1%) aged 18 to 24, 395 people (20.4%) aged 25 to 44, 602 people (31.1%) aged 45 to 64, and 321 people (16.6%) who were 65 years of age or older.  The median age was 43.3 years. For every 100 females, there were 100.0 males.  For every 100 females age 18 and over, there were 97.5 males.

The homeowner vacancy rate was 3.0%; the rental vacancy rate was 5.1%.  1,440 people (74.5% of the population) lived in owner-occupied housing units and 472 people (24.4%) lived in rental housing units.

Climate
According to the Köppen Climate Classification system, Collierville has a warm-summer Mediterranean climate, abbreviated "Csa" on climate maps.

References

Census-designated places in San Joaquin County, California
Census-designated places in California